Novelli is an Italian surname. Notable people with the surname include:

 Amleto Novelli (1885–1924), Italian film actor
 Augusto Novelli (1867–1927), Italian cartoonist
 Bill Novelli, American businessman
 Catherine A. Novelli, American diplomat
 Ermete Novelli (1851–1919), Italian actor
 Gastone Novelli, World War I flying ace
 Giulia Novelli (1858–1932), Italian operatic mezzo-soprano
 Giuseppe Novelli (born 1959), Italian biologist and academic
 Hervé Novelli, French politician
 James Novelli (1885–1940), Italian-American sculptor 
 Jean-Christophe Novelli, French chef
 Luca Novelli (1857–1905), Italian cartoonist and writer
 Mario Novelli, Italian basketball player
 Novello Novelli (1930–2018), Italian actor
 Pietro Novelli (1603–1647), Italian painter and architect

See also
 Porter Novelli, an American public relations firm
 Novello (surname)

Italian-language surnames